Louisiana Constitutional Amendment 1 of 2004, is an amendment to the Louisiana Constitution that makes it unconstitutional for the state to recognize or perform same-sex marriages or civil unions.  The referendum was approved by 78% of the voters.

The text of the amendment states:

Marriage in the state of Louisiana shall consist only of the union of one man and one woman. No official or court of the state of Louisiana shall construe this constitution or any state law to require that marriage or the legal incidents thereof be conferred upon any member of a union other than the union of one man and one woman. A legal status identical or substantially similar to that of marriage for unmarried individuals shall not be valid or recognized. No official or court of the state of Louisiana shall recognize any marriage contracted in any other jurisdiction which is not the union of one man and one woman.

References

External links
 The Money Behind the 2004 Marriage Amendments -- National Institute on Money in State Politics

U.S. state constitutional amendments banning same-sex unions
2004 in LGBT history
LGBT in Louisiana
Same-sex marriage ballot measures in the United States
2004 Louisiana elections
2004 ballot measures
Louisiana ballot measures